Tom Malina (born 14 September 1978) is a Czech windsurfer. He competed in the men's Mistral One Design event at the 2004 Summer Olympics.

References

1978 births
Living people
Czech male sailors (sport)
Czech windsurfers
Olympic sailors of the Czech Republic
Sailors at the 2004 Summer Olympics – Mistral One Design
Sportspeople from Most (city)